Ichma, Ychma, Yschma, Ychsma, Ichmay, Irma, Izma, Ishmay or Ishma (old Quechua for cinnabar, vermilion, crimson color) was a pre-Inca indigenous polity later absorbed by the Inca Empire and reorganized as a wanami (province). For the Inca it was known as Pachakamaq (Pachacamac), rather than its original name of Ishma.

The Ishmay Kingdom was located south of Lima, Peru in the Lurín River valley; it later spread north into the Rímac River valley. The Ishma culture was formed around 1100 AD following the breakup of the Wari Empire. Ishma autonomy lasted until around 1469 when they were absorbed into the Incan Empire.

Despite occupying a desert, the inhabitants of Ishma had a high standard of living, thanks to their expertise in devising multiple irrigation channels as far as the river waters could reach, to give life to an extensive orchard and forest.

Etymology 
Ishma is a word belonging to an extinct language related to the Aymaran family, used to denote the Ishma polity, their capital city, and main god. Following the conquest by the Inca, the word Pachakamaq (Pachacamac), the Quechua translation of Ishma, was used alternately, especially by non-Ishma peoples. The neighboring polities of the Chinchaysuyu used to pronounce it as Ishma, but it was pronounced as Ichma by the Cusco-Quechua speaking peoples like the Inca.

The word Ichma went into Quechua as a synonym of cinnabar and the vermilion/crimson color because it was commonly employed in Ishma wall paints and clothes, the Inca considering vermilion to be prestigious quickly adopted the word into their vocabulary, Incas (the noblesse) called the vermilion color "ichma", while the plebeians used the word "llimpi".

Organization 
The Ishma controlled coastal the valleys of Rimac and Lurin rivers in modern-day Lima, from the mouth—sea of the rivers to the middle valley or "Chaupi Yunga" (middle Yunga altitude, between 500 and 1200 meters of elevation). Ishma territory reached up to the sanctuary of Mama located in Rimac (present-day Ricardo Palma) and the sites of Chontay and Sisicaya in Lurin at 1,000 meters above sea level.

The Ishma were divided into two moiety administrative divisions or saya, these were the anan (upper) saya Ichma and luren (lower) saya Ichma. On the coast, unlike the Andean highlands, the most important moiety often was that of luren (lurin) because it was linked to the sea.

Each saya was in turn divided into unu or waranka subdivisions, which in turn were also divided into the anan and luren moieties, The Ishma dominions of Lati, Surco (Sulco), Guatca, Rimac (Lima), and Maranga (Malanca) were located in the Rimac valley, while the dominions of Pachacamac (Ishma), Manchay, Quilcay (Quilcayuna), and Caringa were located in the Lurin valley.

The city of Pachacamac, formerly known as Ishma before Inca conquest, was the capital of the Ishma kingdom and seat of its rulers. Many Ishma ruins have been discovered along Lima's coast, however other than Pachacamac and a few other sites, there is no consensus on which the large majority sites could correspond to each domain, neither is known their physical distribution. It has been proposed that the archaeological site of Pampa de Flores could be the head of Manchay dominion and residence of the Manchay ayllu (a subdivision of the waranka).

History

With the breakup of the Wari Empire, several small kingdoms and confederations were created. Over time, two cultures came to dominate the region, the Chancay culture to the north of Lima, and the Ishma culture to the south.

Is believed the Ishma people were an Aymara-speaking people that came to inhabit the coastal areas near Lima following the collapse of the Wari empire.

The Ishma people inhabited Pachacamac and continued the growth and influence of the city. The Ishma people constructed at least 16 pyramids in Pachacamac, and built or remodeled more structures in the Lima area.  Among these are Huaca Huantille in the Magdalena del Mar district, Huaca Mateo Salado in Lima's district of Pueblo Libre, Huaca San Borja in the San Borja District, and Huaca Casa Rosada, Huaca Huantinamarca and Huaca San Miguel in the San Miguel District. Additionally, archeological sites in Puruchuco and Cajamarquilla have been ascribed to the Ichma people.

Archaeology 

A number of cultural and human remains have been discovered in various Ichma sites. In the Huaca Huantille, at least 9 mummies have been discovered, buried with ceramic items and jewelry crafted from copper, silver, and gold. In 2012, excavation in the Pachacamac site yielded a burial chamber with more than 80 mummified remains, and a dozen infant remains. Along with the skeletons, this site also contained various artifacts, including ceramic wares, jewellery, and animal remains.

As Luisa Diaz Arriola mentions: "The ethnohistorical narratives made by the Spaniards from 1533 AD, when they arrived in Pachacamac, are enriching but have a bias. They are what the informants wanted to tell, and reflect what the Spaniards of the 16th century considered important to record about those ancient inhabitants of Lima. The chronicles recorded religious beliefs, the importance of the deity Pachacamac and his kin, inter-valley relations, the existence of curacazgos, the coastal ecosystems, the irrigation schemes, among other aspects. But this information is insufficient to know all the dimensions of a past pre-colonial society. Archaeology has direct contact with the material remains left by the ychsma."

Collapse of the Ichma 
When the Inca Empire expanded into this region, the cultures of the Ichma and the Chancay people, along with smaller cultures, were absorbed into the Inca Empire.

See also
History of Peru
Archaeological sites in Peru
Chancay culture

References

South American culture
Former monarchies of South America
Former countries in South America